Ibrahima Sory Soumah (born 22 February 1995) is a Guinean footballer who plays for AS Kaloum Star.

Honours 
AS Kaloum Star
Runner-up
 Guinée Championnat National: 2014–15

External links 
 

1995 births
Living people
Guinean footballers
Guinea international footballers
Association football midfielders
AS Kaloum Star players
Guinea A' international footballers
2016 African Nations Championship players